The 2018–19 Central Michigan Chippewas men's basketball team represented Central Michigan University during the 2018–19 NCAA Division I men's basketball season. The Chippewas, led by seventh-year head coach Keno Davis, played their home games at McGuirk Arena as members of the West Division of the Mid-American Conference. They finished the season 23–12, 10–8 in MAC play to finish in second place in the West Division. They defeated Western Michigan and Kent State to advance to the semifinals of the MAC tournament where they lost to Buffalo. They were invited to the College Basketball Invitational where they lost in the first round to DePaul.

Previous season
The Chippewas finished the 2017–18 season 21–14, 7–11 in MAC play to finish in fifth place in the West Division. They defeated Bowling Green in the first round of the MAC tournament before losing in the quarterfinals to Buffalo. They were invited to the CollegeInsider.com Tournament where they defeated Fort Wayne and Wofford to advance to the quarterfinals where they lost to Liberty.

Offseason

Departures

Incoming Transfers

Recruiting class of 2018

Recruiting class of 2019

Roster

Schedule and results

|-
!colspan=9 style=| Exhibition

|-
!colspan=9 style=| Non-conference regular season

|-
!colspan=9 style=| MAC regular season

|-
!colspan=9 style=| MAC tournament

|-
!colspan=9 style=| College Basketball Invitational
|-

Source

See also
 2018–19 Central Michigan Chippewas women's basketball team

References

Central Michigan
Central Michigan Chippewas men's basketball seasons
Central Michigan